The following lists German active and reserve units within the structure of the German Army. Reserve units do not possess any heavy equipment and their personnel is intended as replacements for losses sustained by regular units.

Unit designations 
The German Army uses Jäger to denote its infantry formations. Mountain infantry is designated as Gebirgsjäger, while Paratroopers are designated as Fallschirmjäger. Armoured units equipped with main battle tanks are designated as Panzer formations, while mechanized infantry units equipped with tracked infantry fighting vehicles are designated as Panzergrenadier formations.

Army Command 
 Army Command (Kommando Heer), in Strausberg
  1st Panzer Division (1. Panzerdivision), in Oldenburg
  10th Panzer Division (10. Panzerdivision), in Veitshöchheim
  Rapid Forces Division (Division Schnelle Kräfte), in Stadtallendorf
  Training Command (Ausbildungskommando), in Leipzig
  Army Development Office (Amt für Heeresentwicklung), in Cologne
  Central Army Storage (Zentrales Langzeitlager), in Herongen
  Central Army Storage (Zentrales Langzeitlager), in Pirmasens
  Central Mobilisation Base (Zentraler Mobilmachungsstützpunkt), in Brück

1st Panzer Division 
  1st Panzer Division (1. Panzerdivision), in Oldenburg
  Staff and Signal Company 1st Panzer Division, in Oldenburg
  1st Operations Support Battalion (Unterstützungsbataillon Einsatz 1), in Oldenburg (Reserve unit)
  325th Artillery Demonstration Battalion (Artillerielehrbataillon 325), in Munster with 24x PzH 2000 155mm self-propelled howitzers, 8x M270 MLRS multiple rocket launch systems, KZO drones and 2x Euro-Art COBRA counter-battery radars
  Signal Battalion 610 (Fernmeldebataillon 610), in Prenzlau (Operationally assigned to NATO's Multinational Corps Northeast)
  901st Heavy Engineer Battalion (Schweres Pionierbataillon 901), in Havelberg (Reserve unit)
Note: The 1st Panzer Division also has the Royal Netherlands Army's 43rd Mechanized Brigade under its command.

9th Panzerlehr Brigade 

  9th Panzerlehr Brigade (Panzerlehrbrigade 9), in Munster
  Staff and Signal Company 9th Panzerlehr Brigade, in Munster
  3rd Reconnaissance Demonstration Battalion (Aufklärungslehrbataillon 3), in Lüneburg with Fennek reconnaissance vehicles and KZO drones
  33rd Panzergrenadier Battalion (Panzergrenadierbataillon 33), in Neustadt am Rübenberge with 44x Puma infantry fighting vehicles
  91st Jäger Battalion (Jägerbataillon 91), in Rotenburg an der Wümme with GTK Boxer armoured personnel carriers
  92nd Panzergrenadier Demonstration Battalion (Panzergrenadierlehrbataillon 92), in Munster with 44x Puma infantry fighting vehicles
  93rd Panzer Demonstration Battalion (Panzerlehrbataillon 93), in Munster with 44x Leopard 2A6 main battle tanks
  130th German/British Bridging Engineer Battalion (Deutsch/Britische Pionierbrückenbataillon 130), in Minden
  141st Supply Battalion (Versorgungsbataillon 141), in Neustadt am Rübenberge

21st Panzer Brigade 
  21st Panzer Brigade (Panzerbrigade 21), in Augustdorf
  Staff and Signal Company 21st Panzer Brigade, in Augustdorf
  7th Reconnaissance Battalion (Aufklärungsbataillon 7), in Ahlen with Fennek reconnaissance vehicles and KZO drones
  1st Jäger Battalion (Jägerbataillon 1), Schwarzenborn with GTK Boxer armoured personnel carriers
  203rd Panzer Battalion (Panzerbataillon 203), in Augustdorf with 44x Leopard 2A7 main battle tanks
  212th Panzergrenadier Battalion (Panzergrenadierbataillon 212), in Augustdorf with 44x Puma infantry fighting vehicles
  921st Jäger Battalion (Jägerbataillon 921), in Schwarzenborn (Reserve unit)
  1st Panzer Engineer Battalion (Panzerpionierbataillon 1), in Holzminden
  7th Supply Battalion (Versorgungsbataillon 7), in Unna

41st Panzergrenadier Brigade 
  41st Panzergrenadier Brigade (Panzergrenadierbrigade 41), in Neubrandenburg
  Staff and Signal Company 41st Panzergrenadier Brigade, in Neubrandenburg
  6th Reconnaissance Battalion (Aufklärungsbataillon 6), in Eutin with Fennek reconnaissance vehicles and KZO drones
  401st Panzergrenadier Battalion (Panzergrenadierbataillon 401), in Hagenow with 44x Marder infantry fighting vehicles
  411th Panzergrenadier Battalion (Panzergrenadierbataillon 411), in Viereck with 44x Marder infantry fighting vehicles
  413th Jäger Battalion (Jägerbataillon 413), in Torgelow with GTK Boxer armoured personnel carriers
  908th Panzergrenadier Battalion (Panzergrenadierbataillon 908), in Viereck (Reserve unit)
  803rd Panzer Engineer Battalion (Panzerpionierbataillon 803), in Havelberg
  142nd Supply Battalion (Versorgungsbataillon 142), in Hagenow

10th Panzer Division 

  10th Panzer Division (10. Panzerdivision), in Veitshöchheim
  10th Signal Battalion (Fernmeldebataillon 10), in Veitshöchheim (activated 1 April 2021)
  10th Operations Support Battalion (Unterstützungsbataillon Einsatz 10), in Veitshöchheim (Reserve unit)
  131st Artillery Battalion (Artilleriebataillon 131), in Weiden in der Oberpfalz with 16x PzH 2000 155mm self-propelled howitzers, 8x M270 MLRS multiple rocket launch systems, KZO drones and 2x Euro-Art COBRA counter-battery radars
  345th Artillery Demonstration Battalion (Artillerielehrbataillon 345), in Idar-Oberstein with 24x PzH 2000 155mm self-propelled howitzers, 8x M270 MLRS multiple rocket launch systems, 12x 120mm mortars, KZO drones and 2x Euro-Art COBRA counter-battery radars
  905th Engineer Battalion (Pionierbataillon 905), in Ingolstadt (Reserve unit)

12th Panzer Brigade 

  12th Panzer Brigade (Panzerbrigade 12), in Cham
  Staff Company 12th Panzer Brigade (Stabskompanie Panzerbrigade 12), in Cham
  8th Reconnaissance Battalion (Aufklärungsbataillon 8), in Freyung with Fennek reconnaissance vehicles and KZO drones
  8th Mountain Panzer Battalion (Gebirgspanzerbataillon 8), in Pfreimd (Reserve unit, 1 of 3 tank companies is active in peacetime and assigned to the 104th Battalion)
  104th Panzer Battalion (Panzerbataillon 104), in Pfreimd with 44x Leopard 2A6 main battle tanks
  112th Panzergrenadier Battalion (Panzergrenadierbataillon 112), in Regen with 44x Puma Infantry fighting vehicles 
  122nd Panzergrenadier Battalion (Panzergrenadierbataillon 122), in Oberviechtach with 44x  Puma Infantry fighting vehicles
  4th Panzer Engineer Battalion (Panzerpionierbataillon 4), in Bogen
  4th Supply Battalion (Versorgungsbataillon 4), in Roding
 Signal Company 12th Panzer Brigade (Fernmeldekompanie Panzerbrigade 12), in Cham

23rd Gebirgsjäger Brigade 
  23rd Gebirgsjäger Brigade (Gebirgsjägerbrigade 23), in Bad Reichenhall
  Staff and Signal Company 23rd Gebirgsjäger Brigade, in Bad Reichenhall
  230th Mountain Reconnaissance Battalion (Gebirgsaufklärungsbataillon 230), in Füssen with Fennek reconnaissance vehicles and KZO drones
  231st Gebirgsjäger Battalion (Gebirgsjägerbataillon 231), in Bad Reichenhall with GTK Boxer armoured personnel carriers
  232nd Gebirgsjäger Battalion (Gebirgsjägerbataillon 232), in Bischofswiesen with Bv206S
  233rd Gebirgsjäger Battalion (Gebirgsjägerbataillon 233), in Mittenwald with Bv206S
  8th Mountain Engineer Battalion (Gebirgspionierbataillon 8), in Ingolstadt
  8th Mountain Supply Battalion (Gebirgsversorgungsbataillon 8), in Füssen
  230th Mountain Pack Animal Operations and Training Centre (Einsatz- und Ausbildungszentrum für Gebirgstragtierwesen 230), in Bad Reichenhall

37th Panzergrenadier Brigade 
  37th Panzergrenadier Brigade (Panzergrenadierbrigade 37), in Frankenberg
  Staff Company 37th Panzergrenadier Brigade (Stabskompanie Panzergrenadierbrigade 37), in Frankenberg
  13h Reconnaissance Battalion (Aufklärungsbataillon 13), in Gotha with Fennek reconnaissance vehicles and KZO drones
  363rd Panzer Battalion (Panzerbataillon 363), in Hardheim with 44x Leopard 2A6 main battle tanks
  371st Panzergrenadier Battalion (Panzergrenadierbataillon 371), in Marienberg with 44x Marder infantry fighting vehicles
  391st Panzergrenadier Battalion (Panzergrenadierbataillon 391), in Bad Salzungen with 44x Marder infantry fighting vehicles
  393rd Panzer Battalion (Panzerbataillon 393), in Bad Frankenhausen with 44x Leopard 2A6 main battle tanks
  909th Panzergrenadier Battalion (Panzergrenadierbataillon 909), in Marienberg (Reserve unit)
  701st Panzer Engineer Battalion (Panzerpionierbataillon 701), in Gera
  131st Supply Battalion (Versorgungsbataillon 131), in Bad Frankenhausen
  Signal Company 37th Panzergrenadier Brigade (Fernmeldekompanie Panzergrenadierbrigade 37), in Frankenberg

Franco-German Brigade 
The division also has administrative control of the German units in the Franco-German Brigade:

  Franco-German Brigade (Deutsch-Französische Brigade), in Müllheim
  291st Jäger Battalion (Jägerbataillon 291), in Illkirch-Graffenstaden (FR)
  292nd Jäger Battalion (Jägerbataillon 292), in Donaueschingen
  295th Artillery Battalion (Artilleriebataillon 295), in Stetten am kalten Markt with 16x PzH 2000 155mm self-propelled howitzers, 8x M270 MLRS multiple rocket launch systems, KZO drones and 2x Euro-Art COBRA counter-battery radars
  German-French Supply Battalion (Deutsch-Französisches Versorgungsbataillon), in Müllheim
  550th Panzer Engineer Company (Panzerpionierkompanie 550), in Stetten am kalten Markt

Rapid Forces Division 

  Rapid Forces Division (Division Schnelle Kräfte), in Stadtallendorf
  Staff and Signal Company, Rapid Forces Division, in Stadtallendorf
 Staff and Command Support Company, Special Operations Component Command (SOCC), in Hardheim
 Long Range Reconnaissance Company 1, in Schwarzenborn (activated 1 Oktober 2022)

Note: The Rapid Forces Division also has the Royal Netherlands Army's 11th Airmobile Brigade under its command.

1st Airborne Brigade 
  1st Airborne Brigade (Luftlandebrigade 1), in Saarlouis
  Staff and Signal Company 1st Airborne Brigade, in Saarlouis
  26th Fallschirmjäger Regiment (Fallschirmjägerregiment 26), in Zweibrücken
 1x Staff, 2x Paratroopers-Commando, 3x Paratroopers, 1x Fire Support, 1x Supply, 1x Medical, 1x Reserve, and 1x Training Company 
  31st Fallschirmjäger Regiment (Fallschirmjägerregiment 31), in Seedorf
 1x Staff, 2x Paratroopers-Commando, 3x Paratroopers, 1x Fire Support, 1x Supply, 1x Medical, 1x Reserve, and 1x Training Company 
  260th Airborne Reconnaissance Company (Luftlandeaufklärungskompanie 260), in Lebach
  310th Airborne Reconnaissance Company (Luftlandeaufklärungskompanie 310), in Seedorf
  260th Airborne Engineer Company (Luftlandepionierkompanie 260), in Saarlouis
  270th Airborne Engineer Company (Luftlandepionierkompanie 270), in Seedorf

Special Forces Command 
  Special Forces Command (Kommando Spezialkräfte) (KSK), in Calw
 1x Staff, 1x Special Recon, 1x Special Commando, 3x Commando, 1x Signal Company, 1x Medical, 1x Support, and 1x Supply company; a Training Department and a Development Department

Helicopter Command 
  Helicopter Command (Kommando Hubschrauber), in Bückeburg
  10th Transport Helicopter Regiment (Transporthubschrauberregiment 10), in Faßberg with 40x NH90 transport helicopters
  30th Transport Helicopter Regiment (Transporthubschrauberregiment 30), in Niederstetten with 40x NH90 transport helicopters
  36th Attack Helicopter Regiment (Kampfhubschrauberregiment 36), at Fritzlar Air Base with 40x Eurocopter Tiger attack helicopters
  International Helicopter Training Centre (Internationales Hubschrauberausbildungszentrum), in Bückeburg
  Army Helicopter Maintenance Centre (Systemzentrum Drehflügler Heer), in Donauwörth

Other units 
As part of the Multinational Corps Northeast:

  Multinational Corps Northeast, in Szczecin, Poland
  610th Signal Battalion (Fernmeldebataillon 610), in Prenzlau (Under administrative control of the 1st Panzerdivision)

As part of the Royal Netherlands Army's 43rd Mechanized Brigade:

  43rd Mechanized Brigade (43 Gemechaniseerde Brigade), in Havelte
  414th Panzer Battalion (Panzerbataillon 414), in Bergen

Training Command 
  Training Command (Ausbildungskommando), in Leipzig
  Army Officer School (Offizierschule des Heeres), in Dresden
  Army Tactics Centre (Taktikzentrum des Heeres), Dresden
  Army Non-commissioned Officer School (Unteroffizierschule des Heeres, in Delitzsch
  1st Sergeant/ NCO Candidate Battalion (Feldwebel-/Unteroffizieranwärterbataillon 1), in Sondershausen
  2nd Sergeant/ NCO Candidate Battalion (Feldwebel-/Unteroffizieranwärterbataillon 2), in Celle
  3rd Sergeant/ NCO Candidate Battalion (Feldwebel-/Unteroffizieranwärterbataillon 3), in Altenstadt
  Infantry Training Centre (Ausbildungszentrum Infanterie), in Hammelburg
  Mountain and Winter Combat Training Base (Ausbildungsstützpunkt Gebirgs- und Winterkampf), in Mittenwald
  Airborne/ Air Transport Training Base (Ausbildungsstützpunkt Luftlande/Lufttransport), in Altenstadt
  2nd Officer Candidate Battalion (Offizieranwärterbataillon 2), in Hammelburg
  Training Centre Munster (Ausbildungszentrum Munster), in Munster
  Army Reconnaissance Troops Training Department (Ausbildungsbereich Heeresaufklärungstruppe), in Munster
  Panzer Troops Training (Ausbildungsbereich Panzertruppen), in Munster
  Armed Forces Joint Tactical Fire Support/ Indirect Fire Training (Ausbildungsbereich Streitkräftegemeinsame Taktische Feuerunterstützung/Indirektes Feuer), in Idar-Oberstein
  1st Officer Candidate Battalion (Offizieranwärterbataillon 1), in Munster
  Engineer Training Centre (Ausbildungszentrum Pioniere), in Ingolstadt
  Explosive Ordnance Disposal Training Base (Ausbildungsstützpunkt Kampfmittelabwehr), in Stetten am kalten Markt
  Land Systems Technology Training Centre (Ausbildungszentrum Technik Landsysteme), in Aachen
  Special Operations Training Centre (Ausbildungszentrum Spezielle Operationen), in Pfullendorf
  Air Mobility Training and Exercise Centre (Ausbildungs- und Übungszentrum Luftbeweglichkeit), in Celle
  Army Combat Simulation Centre (Gefechtssimulationszentrum Heer), in Wildflecken
  Army Combat Training Centre (Gefechtsübungszentrum Heer), in Letzlingen
  Bundeswehr United Nations Training Centre (Vereinte Nationen Ausbildungszentrum Bundeswehr), in Hammelburg

Geographic Distribution

Cyber and Information Domain Command 
Signals, Psychological Operations, Strategic Reconnaissance (incl. SIGINT), Geographic Information (incl. military satellites), and Electronic Warfare units of the German Armed Forces fall under the Cyber and Information Domain Command (Kommando Cyber- und Informationsraum) of the Bundeswehr. Therefore, the German Army does not have its own units of such type, but is supported by the units of the Cyber and Information Space Command as needed.

Joint Support Service 
Logistics, CBRN defense and Military Police units of the German Armed Forces fall under the Joint Support Service (Streitkräftebasis) of the Bundeswehr. Therefore, the German Army does not have its own units of such type, but is supported by the units of the Joint Support Service as needed.

Joint Medical Service 
All medical units of the German Armed Forces fall under the Joint Medical Service of the Bundeswehr (Zentraler Sanitätsdienst der Bundeswehr). Therefore, the German Army does not have its own medical units, but is supported by the units of the Joint Medical Service as needed.

References 

German Army